Kenner is a 1969 American drama film directed by Steve Sekely and written by Robert L. Richards and Harold Clemins. The film stars Jim Brown, Madlyn Rhue, Robert Coote, Ricky Cordell, Charles Horvath and Prem Nath. The film was released on April 23, 1969, by Metro-Goldwyn-Mayer.

Plot
After his partner is murdered in Singapore, Roy Kenner travels to Bombay in search of the killer, a man named Tom Jordan. He meets a fatherless young boy, Saji, and begins to fall in love with the boy's mother, Anasuya, then takes Saji under his wing when she is accidentally killed. After a final confrontation with Jordan atop a building, Kenner takes the boy home with him to America.

Cast

See also
 List of American films of 1969

References

External links 
 

1969 films
American drama films
1969 drama films
Metro-Goldwyn-Mayer films
Films directed by Steve Sekely
1960s English-language films
1960s American films